Satawalese is a Micronesian language of the Federated States of Micronesia. It is nearly mutually intelligible with Mortlockese and Carolinian.

Introduction

History
Satawalese is a language spoken on the island of Satawal, located in the Federated States of Micronesia. The language is also spoken in Yap State, nearby atolls and islands such as Lamotrek, Woleai, Puluwat, Pulusuk, and Chuuk State. Smaller populations of speakers can also be found in Saipan, the Commonwealth of the Northern Mariana Islands, and some parts of the United States.  According to a 1987 census, Satawalese is spoken by approximately 460 people however this number has grown, according to a count taken by researcher Kevin Roddy who reported for about 700 speakers in 2007.

Classification
Satawalese is identified as an Austronesian language and is a member of the Chuukic language subgroup. Discovered by scholar Edward Quackenbush, the Chuukic subgroup is a dialect chain composed of a variety of about 17 different languages and dialects extending 2,100 kilometers across the western Pacific (Roddy, 2007). This chain begins at Chuuk in the east and stretches towards Sonsorol in the west. In the center of this dialect continuum lies Satawalese.  Using the comparative method, which involves the observation of vocabulary and sound correspondence similarities, linguists were able to link Satawalese as well as its sister languages to the Chuukic language family. Sister languages of Satawalese include Carolinian, Chuukese, Mapia, Mortlockese, Namonuito, Paafang, Puluwatese, Sonsorol, Tanapag, Tobian, Ulithian, and Woleaian.

Sounds

Consonants
Satawalese language contains 13 specific consonants. /p/, /f/, /m/, /w/, /n/, /t/, /s/, /r/, /j/, /k/, /t͡ʃ/, /ŋ/, /ɻ/

The existence of the phoneme  is debated in Satawalese. Some scholars believe the phoneme to be an allophone of the phoneme . It is suggested that in Satawalese language both phonemes can be interchanged without changing the meaning of a word. Opposing studies suggest  to be its own separate phoneme.

The phoneme  in Satawalese has been identified as an allophone for the phoneme  due to influence of surrounding languages.   is not included in the Satawalese phoneme inventory but is a part of similar languages close in proximity.

Vowels
Satawalese contains nine vowels:/i/, /a/, /o/, /u/, /æ/, /ɛ/, /ʉ/, /ɞ/, /ɒ/.

Grammar

Basic word order
Satawalese use Subject-Object-Verb word order.

Ex:
Mary a foato-ki tinikii we aan “Mary wrote her letter.”

Reduplication
Reduplication is available in the Satawalese language.  It is used mainly to show a progressive form of a verb, noun, or adjective.

Ex
‘’ras’’ vt. to pull something until it breaks. 
‘’rasras’’ vt. progressive form of ras; the continuous pulling of something until it breaks
‘’rig’’ adj. small.
‘’rigrig’’ adj. progressive form of rig; smaller.
‘’seo’’ rested.
‘’seoseo’’ v. resting.
‘’pis’’ n. splash. 
‘’pisipis’’ adj. progressive form of pis; 'splashing around'.

Numerals
Like most Pacific languages as well as many languages around the world, Satawalese takes advantage of a base ten counting system. The Satawalese language contains two basic counting systems (Roddy, 2007).  One system is the fast version, which is the version used for counting objects as well as game playing.  The second counting system in Satawal is the slow version.  This system is used when teaching young children the numeral system, and is also used by older generations.
	
Slow version		Fast version		English translation
‘’Eota’’ *‘’Eot’’ one
‘’Riuwa’’ *‘’Riuw’’ two
‘’Eoniu’’  *‘’Eon’’three
‘’Faeni’’ *‘’Faen’’four
‘’Nima’’ *‘’Nim’’five
‘’Wona’’ *‘’On’’ six
‘’Fiusa’’ *‘’Fius’’seven
‘’Waani’’ *‘’Wan’’ eight
‘’Tiwa*‘’Tiw’’nine

Large numbers are also existent in the Satawalese language.  All numbers greater than ten are produced by using the conjunction me, which translates to the word “and” in English.  For example, the numeral eleven is seig me ew, which translates to “ten and one” in English or eleven.  One billion is the largest numeral in the Satawalese language.  It is expressed as engeras ssen or one thousand million.

Vocabulary

Indigenous vocabulary
saam -father
rheon -leaf
pwun -heart
oattoaur -to eat (polite form)
moat -to sit
manewe -person
ig -fish
kanok -dog
kiuw -louse
wanwan -tree
aweri -to see
mae -to die
eito -to come 
rhan -water
fai -stone
rhug -mountain
aenet -sun
pai -hand
fiufiu -star

Loanwords
Satawalese has borrowed words from major language countries that had traveled throughout the Pacific such as Japan, Spain, and the United States, as well as nearby languages within the Federated States of Micronesia, such as Woleaian and Ulithian.

Words derived from English:
	
aispwoax – Ice box; refrigerator
felowa - bread; flour
finoras – flowers
frii – free
friiseor – freezer
karesiin – kerosene

Words derived from Ulithian:

aasi – to take (it)
aaileng – world
fiifi – soup
kaerboaw – cow

Words derived from Spanish:
	
floras – flowers									
kanemasa – pumpkin

Words derived from Japanese:
	
kanepwas – calabash
kachito – movie

Words derived from Woleaian:
	
gamaeinoak – pretend
faisun – as it is
" ngang"- Me
"Ito-come

Endangerment

Materials
Satawalese language resources have become quite abundant in the past decade. Alphabet books, translations, as well as dictionaries are all available in the Satawalese language. Also linguistic studies have been documented sharing the language’s grammar, phonology, vocabulary, stories, etc.

Vitality
According to endangeredlanguages.com Satawalese is classified as an endangered language. However, the language Satawalese shows much promise for the future. Satawalese is spoken as an L1 by most of the population occupying the island of Satawal. It is also used throughout the Federated States of Micronesia as well as nearby states. Also, according to David Roddy the population of Satawalese speakers has grown to 700 in an accounting taken in 2007. Awareness of the island has been a current enhancement to the language due to the contributions made of voyager Mau Piailug who was known to have been the first navigator aboard the ship of the infamous Hawaiian double-hulled canoe the Hokulea.  With this discovery, interest in the island including the people, culture, and language have been uprooted, meaning more linguistic studies can be done, possibly more resources can be added, and so on. Finally, the Satawalese language documentation is outstanding. As stated before dictionaries and alphabet books have been created allowing the transmission of the language to occur between older and younger generations.

Further reading

The Navigator's Of Satawal, Mau Piailug's Star Compass.mpg. https://www.youtube.com/watch?v=TpX04U9FvTU.
Roddy, Kevin M. (2007).  A Sketch Grammar of Satawalese, The Language of Satawal Island, 	Yap State, Micronesia.  Retrieved from The University of Hawai’i Manoa Scholarspace 	website:http://scholarspace.manoa.hawaii.edu/bitstream/handle/10125/20678/M.A.CB5.H3_3421_r.pdf?sequence=2.
Satawalese.  Endangered Languages.  http://www.endangeredlanguages.com/lang/5426
The Trukic Language Continuum in Night Thoughts of a Field Linguist (2005, May 12).  Message posted to http://fieldlinguistnotes.wordpress.com/2005/05/12/the-trukic-	language-continuum/.

References

Chuukic languages
Endangered Austronesian languages
Endangered languages of Oceania
Languages of the Federated States of Micronesia
Severely endangered languages